Dubovoye is a rural locality (a selo) and the administrative center of Dubovsky Selsoviet of Mikhaylovsky District, Amur Oblast, Russia. The population was 302 as of 2018. There are 12 streets.

Geography 
Dubovoye is located 21 km northeast of Poyarkovo (the district's administrative centre) by road. Privolnoye is the nearest rural locality.

References 

Rural localities in Mikhaylovsky District, Amur Oblast